Lajo Jose is an Indian writer of Malayalam literature. He is known for his crime thriller and mystery novels which include Coffee House, Hydrangea, Ruthinte Lokam, Rest in Peace and Kanya Maria. His latest work is Orange Thottathile Athidhi, published by Mathrubhumi Books in 2023.

Biography 
Lajo Jose was born in Kottayam district of the south Indian state of Kerala. His works contribute to academic research and literary studies related to Crime Fiction in Malayalam. After his education, he joined the insurance sector where he held the position of a regional manager at Max Life Insurance before quitting the job in 2015. Subsequently, he focused on writing, initially screenplays but he did not succeed in getting any foothold in film industry which made him turn to fiction and his first novel, Coffee House, was published in May 2018. His next work, Hydrangea, was a success with three editions coming out in a single month. Both Coffee House and Hydrangea are part of the Esther Emmanuel series. This was followed by Ruthinte Lokam in 2019, Rest in Peace, a cozy mystery, in 2020 published by Mathrubhumi Books. and 'Kanya Maria', a DC Books publication, in 2022. The latest of his works is 'Orange Thottathile Athidhi', published by Mathrubhumi Books, in 2023.

Bibliography

See also 

 James Patterson
 Kottayam Pushpanath

References

Further reading

External links 
 
 
 
 
 
 

Living people
Malayalam novelists
Indian crime fiction writers
People from Kerala
Indian male novelists
Malayalam-language writers
Writers from Kottayam
20th-century Indian novelists
21st-century Indian novelists
Novelists from Kerala
Year of birth missing (living people)